Saint-Fiacre is the name or partial name of four communes in France.

Saint-Fiacre, Côtes-d'Armor, in the Côtes-d'Armor département
Saint-Fiacre, Seine-et-Marne, in the Seine-et-Marne département
Saint-Fiacre-sur-Maine, in the Loire-Atlantique département
Cuy-Saint-Fiacre in the Seine-Maritime département

See also
 Fiacre